Bibhagdi High School is a combined school located in Nagarkanda Upazila of Faridpur District, Bangladesh. The school was founded in 1867 with only 8 students. Now it has more than seven hundred students. The school offers grades from class VI to class X.

References

High schools in Bangladesh
1867 establishments in India
Educational institutions established in 1867